Kupalawskaya is a Minsk Metro station. Opened on December 31, 1990.

The station is one of three on the Minsk Metro to have been built with an entrance in an existing building, the other two being Kastrychnitskaya and Ploshcha Lyenina.

2011 bombing

The adjacent Kastrychnitskaya station was the site of a bombing on April 11, 2011.

Gallery

References

Minsk Metro stations
Railway stations opened in 1990